Vernon Gerald Ruhle (January 25, 1951 – January 20, 2007) was an American professional baseball right-handed pitcher and coach, who played in Major League Baseball (MLB), primarily for the Detroit Tigers and Houston Astros for 13 seasons, from  to .

Early life
Ruhle was born in Coleman, Michigan, and attended Olivet College, where he was a member of the Kappa Sigma Alpha fraternity. He was selected by the Detroit Tigers, in the 17th round of the 1972 Major League Baseball draft.

Baseball career
Ruhle made his debut with Detroit, in September 1974. He joined the Tigers' starting rotation the following year, posting a record of 11 wins and 12 losses, on a team that finished 57–102. On August 12, Ruhle was presented with his university degree from Olivet College, during a pre-game ceremony at Tiger Stadium.

Ruhle gave up a third-inning single to Hank Aaron on May 1, 1975, driving in Sixto Lezcano for Aaron's record-breaking 2,210th run batted in (RBI), to surpass Babe Ruth's record of 2,209. On May 12, 1975, Ruhle allowed 12 baserunners in his 7 1/3 innings to earn a win. That night, the Royals left a record-tying 15 men on base, without scoring, in a 5–0 loss to the Tigers. The 15 runners left-on-base (LOB) in a shutout had been done 3 times before‚ the last on August 1‚ 1941.
Ruhle was released by Detroit toward the end of spring training in  but was signed by the Houston Astros the following day.

He left the game with a 2–1 lead in the eighth inning. Houston needed only one more victory to reach their first World Series, but Philadelphia came back to win, 5–3, in 10 innings and took the series after winning the decisive fifth game.

Ruhle was the center of a controversial play in his Game Four League Championship Series start. With two runners on in the fourth inning, Ruhle fielded a soft liner off the bat of Garry Maddox and immediately threw to first base. However, Philadelphia players raced out of the dugout to argue that Ruhle had trapped the ball. During the argument, first baseman Art Howe stepped on second base and claimed a triple play. After 20 minutes, it was ruled a catch, but the triple play was completed after time had been called, and was disallowed. Ruhle had a no-decision as the Astros lost in the tenth inning. He later started in Game Four of the 1981 National League Division Series against the Los Angeles Dodgers, losing a complete game 2–1 pitchers' duel with Fernando Valenzuela, as Houston again wasted a 2–1 series advantage and lost in five games.

Ruhle continued to start less regularly before primarily shifting to relief work in –. He joined the California Angels in June  and closed his career that year working mainly out of the bullpen. His last appearance was in Game 4 of the 1986 American League Championship Series against the Boston Red Sox, entering with the Angels trailing 1–0 with two out in the seventh inning; he surrendered two more runs in the eighth inning, but the Angels won in 11 innings after tying the game with three runs in the ninth.

In a 13-year major league career, Ruhle posted a record of 67–88 with 582 strikeouts and a 3.73 ERA in 327 games.

Death
Ruhle died in Houston, Texas after a yearlong battle with multiple myeloma, on January 20, 2007. He was married to Sue at time of death. He had two children from his first marriage to Darlene Mekulen Ruhle, Kenny and Rebecca.

References

External links

Vern Ruhle at Baseball Almanac
Vern Ruhle at Baseball Biography
Vern Ruhle at Astros Daily
Vern Ruhle at Pura Pelota (Venezuelan Professional Baseball League)

1951 births
2007 deaths
American expatriate baseball players in Canada
Baseball players from Michigan
Baseball players from Houston
Bristol Tigers players
California Angels players
Cardenales de Lara players
American expatriate baseball players in Venezuela
Charleston Charlies players
Cincinnati Reds coaches
Cleveland Indians players
Columbus Astros players
Deaths from cancer in Texas
Deaths from multiple myeloma
Detroit Tigers players
Edmonton Trappers players
Evansville Triplets players
Houston Astros coaches
Houston Astros players
Lakeland Tigers players
Major League Baseball pitchers
Major League Baseball pitching coaches
Montgomery Rebels players
Olivet Comets baseball players
New York Mets coaches
People from Midland County, Michigan
Philadelphia Phillies coaches
Rocky Mount Leafs players
San Jose Bees players